Jim Clements is an American football coach and former player. He is the head football coach at Kutztown University of Pennsylvania, a position he has held since the 2014 season. Clements served as the head football coach at Delaware Valley College—now known as Delaware Valley University—in Doylestown, Pennsylvania from 2006 to 2013.

Head coaching record

References

External links
 Kutztown Golden Bears bio
 Delaware Valley Aggies bio

Year of birth missing (living people)
Living people
American football defensive linemen
Delaware Valley Aggies football coaches
Kutztown Golden Bears football coaches
Widener Pride football coaches
Widener Pride football players